John Christopher Hartwick (January 6, 1714 – July 17, 1796) was an American Lutheran minister in Colonial America and founder of Hartwick College.

Background
Hartwick was a native of the dukedom of Saxe-Gotha in the province of Thuringia in
Germany and studied at the University of Halle. He was educated in the Lutheran Pietism movement.  Hartwick emigrated to America in 1746 to serve as a missionary to the German settlers in and around Rhinebeck in New York’s Hudson Valley.

He was an eccentric idealist and intolerant of parishioner's vices, requiring them to sign a promise that they would "forswear shooting, horse-racing, boozing, and dancing."  He was forcefully removed from his first parish by fellow ministers of the area, and from there moved around the northern colonies, unable to find a congregation that would put up with his pious intolerance.

New Jerusalem 
Hartwick felt that allowing common persons to own land and live far from one another was the cause of their immorality.  He envisioned a utopian community dedicated to the principles of pious living.  He made a series of land deals and eventually obtained a nearly 24,000 acre (97 km²) land patent from the Mohawk of Indians in Otsego County, New York located southwest of what would become Cooperstown, New York.

The first attempt toward a permanent settlement on the site was made by Hartwick in 1761. Hartwick commissioned his neighboring landowner, Judge William Cooper, to lease his land to suitable Christian settlers for the establishment of this "New Jerusalem."  But Cooper essentially ignored Hartwick's criteria, and leased the property indiscriminately.  Most (if not all) of his tenants had little interest in Hartwick's utopian vision for the settlement. His holdings would form the basis for the community of Hartwick, New York.

In 1764 Hartwick wrote an article condemning the death penalty for theft as contrary to divine law. He believed there should be government-run educational schools to replace the exclusive private schools of the day. John Christopher Hartwick died during 1796 at Clermont Manor, the home of Robert R. Livingston.

Hartwick College

Hartwick had benefited financially from Cooper’s indiscriminate leasing deals and left instructions in his will for the founding of a public seminary. However he made the task difficult by designating Jesus Christ as his heir.  The seminary did not open until 15 years after his death.

Hartwick's choice as director of the seminary had been Dr. John Christopher Kunze a leading Lutheran theologian. Prominent political and religious leaders Jeremiah Van Rensselaer and Frederick Muhlenberg convinced Dr. Kunze to direct the seminary and teach theology at his home in New York City.  Also benefiting from Hartwick's endowments were Rev. Anthony Braun who taught sciences and languages in Albany and Rev. John Frederick Ernst who taught elementary school on the Hartwick land patent.

The school first known as the Hartwick Seminary, eventually became Hartwick College. Hartwick College traces its founding to the death of John Christopher Hartwick in 1796. During the 1920s, the Trustees of Hartwick Seminary voted to close the seminary and use the funds to open a new college in the nearby city of Oneonta, New York.

Notes

External links
John Christopher Hartwick Society
John Christopher Hartwick: Orthodoxy and Pietism
Pioneers of Hartwick, New York

Further reading
Alan Taylor, William Cooper’s Town  (1995)
James Fenimore Cooper, The Chronicles of Cooperstown(1838)

1714 births
1796 deaths
18th-century German Lutheran clergy
German emigrants to the Thirteen Colonies
History of Christianity in the United States
People from Hartwick, New York
People of the Province of New York
18th-century American Lutheran clergy